Nortetrazepam is a drug which is a benzodiazepine derivative. It is one of the major metabolites of tetrazepam.

See also
Benzodiazepine

References

Benzodiazepines
Chloroarenes
GABAA receptor positive allosteric modulators
Lactams
Cyclohexenes